Gibidumsee may refer to two lakes in the canton of Valais, Switzerland:

Gebidumsee, a natural lake at Visperterminen
Stausee Gibidum ("Stausee Gebidem"), a reservoir at Naters